Tjæreborg is a village with a population of 2,904 (1 January 2022) on the west coast of Denmark, in Esbjerg Municipality about  east of Esbjerg. It is situated in the parish with the same name, which was a part of Esbjerg Municipality also before the municipal mergers 1 January 2007.

Notable people 
 Nicolaj Køhlert (born 1993 in Tjæreborg) a Danish footballer
 Lasse Vigen Christensen (born 1994 in Tjæreborg) a Danish footballer
 Ejlif Krogager, former priest of Tjæreborg, founded the major Danish travel agency Tjæreborg Rejser

References

Cities and towns in the Region of Southern Denmark
Esbjerg Municipality